The 2021 Penn State Nittany Lions football team represented Pennsylvania State University in the 2021 NCAA Division I FBS football season. The team competed as a member of the Big Ten Conference and played their home games at Beaver Stadium in University Park, Pennsylvania. The team was led by eighth-year head coach James Franklin.

The Nittany Lions had a promising start to the season, going 5–0 and beating a ranked Wisconsin and Auburn, to reach number 4 in the AP poll. However during their game against #3 Iowa, quarterback Sean Clifford was injured, stalling all momentum they had, allowing Iowa to come back and beat them 23–20. The next week they played an unranked Illinois to hopefully regain momentum ahead of playing rival Ohio State on the road, however they lost in a record breaking 9OT. The Nittany Lions would then lose the next four of their last six games, finishing their season at 7–6 after losing to Arkansas in the Outback Bowl.

Previous season
The Big Ten initially withdrew from the 2020 season due to the COVID-19 pandemic, but later reinstated the season, playing an eight game schedule beginning on October 24. The Nittany Lions finished the season 4–5, starting out the season 0–5, the worst start in the program's history. They rebounded in the second half of the season, winning the last four of their games. They announced on December 19 that they would remove themselves from bowl game consideration.

Offseason

Players drafted into the NFL

Preseason

Preseason Big Ten poll
Cleveland.com has polled sports journalists representing all member schools as a de facto preseason media poll since 2011, making this the first preseason Big Ten poll since 2010. For the 2021 poll, Penn State was projected to finish second in the East Division.

Personnel

Coaching staff

Roster

Source:

Schedule

Spring game
Due to the ongoing COVID-19 pandemic, Penn State did not host their annual Blue vs. White scrimmage. In lieu of the Blue vs. White game, the university invited the freshmen class to Beaver Stadium for what was meant to be the final spring practice on April 17. More than 7,500 Penn State freshmen attended. Following backlash from students and the public, an extra practice was scheduled for April 23, initially limited to Penn State seniors with an in-person class, but soon opened tickets to all seniors, then to the general public.

Regular season
The Nittany Lions hosted three non-conference games: the Ball State Cardinals from the Mid-American Conference (MAC), the Auburn Tigers (first ever regular season meeting) from the Southeastern Conference (SEC), and the Villanova Wildcats an FCS school from the Colonial Athletic Association (CAA).

PSU played Big Ten opponents Wisconsin, Indiana, Iowa, Illinois, Ohio State, Maryland, Michigan, Rutgers, and Michigan State. The schedule consisted of seven home games and five road games.

 Schedule Source

Game summaries

at No. 12 Wisconsin

Ball State

No. 22 Auburn

No. 11 (FCS) Villanova

Indiana

at No. 3 Iowa

Illinois

at No. 5 Ohio State

at Maryland

No. 9AP/6CFP Michigan

Rutgers

at No. 12AP/CFP Michigan State

vs. No. 22AP/21CFP Arkansas (Outback Bowl)

Rankings

Awards and honors

References

Penn State
Penn State Nittany Lions football seasons
Penn State Nittany Lions football